Dan Anstey (born 19 December 1984 in Brisbane, Queensland), is an Australian radio and television presenter.

He is known for hosting the Nine Network television series ManSpace, the 7mate Stihl Timbersports Series and various shows across the Nova and Southern Cross Austereo radio networks, and also appearances on The Project.

Personal life 
After graduating as dux of Nambour State High School in 2001, Anstey attained a bachelor's degree in electrical engineering with Honours from the University of Queensland in 2005.

He has a verified IQ of 134, making him eligible to join Mensa.

On Christmas Day, 2017 he became engaged to his long-term girlfriend Clare Dufty. They married on the Gold Coast on 25 August 2018, and have a daughter named name Halle Ann born 14 April 2019.

Career

Radio 
Anstey began his radio career in 2007 as part of Brisbane's Nova 106.9 promotional street team, of which Scott Tweedie was also a member.

In 2011 he was named as co-host of the Nova 106.9 breakfast show alongside Ashley Bradnam, David Lutteral and Camilla Severi.  When Kip Wightman returned to station in 2012 Anstey was shifted to "The Dan Anstey Show" which aired weekday afternoons, before again being moved to Melbourne sister station Nova 100 as anchor of the breakfast show Hughesy & Kate.

When Hughesy & Kate ended in 2013 Anstey was hired by rival Melbourne station Fox FM to anchor its new breakfast show Fifi & Dave. In 2015, Fox FM announced he would be leaving the show and was to be replaced by Byron Cooke. 

On 27 May 2022, Anstey announced his resignation from 90.9 Sea FM and from the breakfast show with Bianca Dye and Ben Hannant after six years with the station. He later announced that he will join Triple M to anchor breakfast with Greg 'Marto' Martin and Margaux Parker.

Television 

In 2007, Anstey began presenting short film reviews on Reel2Reel, a film review program broadcast by the Brisbane community television station Briz31 (now known as Queensland Online TV).

He has been a regular contributor to The Project since 2010, reporting from Brisbane, Melbourne and the Gold Coast.

In 2014, Anstey was named as host of the Nine Network television series ManSpace, alongside Shane Jacobson and Dale Vine. He has hosted two seasons of the program with a third currently in production.

In January 2022, Anstey joined Weekend Today as weather presenter.

Other 
Along with Leon Murray he hosted the internet series Add a Motor to it in 2011. The show featured various everyday items that had been motorised, including a couch that set the world record for fastest sofa at 163 km/h (101 mph).

In 2014, Anstey was part of an MLC advertising campaign that tasked him with delivering a plate of Australian lamb to Julian Assange, at the time a political refugee in the Ecuadorian Embassy of London. He was unsuccessful in his duty.

Awards and honours 
Anstey was named one of "The Top New Talent to Watch" in 2014 by Radio Today.

He has twice won the Australian Commercial Radio Award for Best Comedy Segment, in 2012 and 2015, and was a presenter, appearing on stage dressed as a clown, at the ceremony in 2014 with Fifi Box.

References

External links
 Official website
 
 Dan Anstey Twitter
 Dan Anstey SoundCloud
 Triple M Brisbane

1984 births
Living people
Australian radio and television personalities
Nova (radio network) announcers
Australian television talk show hosts